Allerthorpe is a village and civil parish in the East Riding of Yorkshire, England.

The civil parish is formed by the village of Allerthorpe and the hamlet of Waplington.
According to the 2011 UK census, Allerthorpe parish had a population of 220, a slight reduction from the 2001 UK census figure of 223.

Allerthorpe has a public house, The Plough Inn, an 18-hole golf course and a lake used for water sports and fishing. Allerthorpe Common, to the west of the village, has a nature reserve.

Allerthorpe's Victorian Grade II listed Anglican parish church is dedicated to St Botolph.

From the mediaeval era until the 19th century Allerthorpe was part of Harthill Wapentake.
Between 1894 and 1974 it was a part of the Pocklington Rural District, in the East Riding of Yorkshire. Between 1974 and 1996 it was part of the Borough of North Wolds (later Borough of East Yorkshire), in the county of Humberside.

The K6 telephone box on Main Street is Grade II listed.

Thomas Cooke, the machinist and optical instrument maker, was born here. There is a memorial stone to him near the church gate and a blue plaque was unveiled in the village hall in 2009.

William Dewsbury the Quaker minister was born in the village.

References

External links

Allerthorpe Common Nature Reserve

Villages in the East Riding of Yorkshire
Civil parishes in the East Riding of Yorkshire